Ketanggungan Barat Station (KGB) is a class III railway station located in Cigedog, Kersana, Brebes Regency. The station, which is located at an altitude of +16 m, is included in the Cirebon Operational Area III and is a railway station that is located in the westernmost part of Central Java through the Cirebon–Prupuk segment.

At the time this station was still active, this station had three railway tracks with track 2 as a straight line. Since 15 December 2014, this station has been inactive due to double tracks operation on the Ciledug–Larangan segment. In addition to the double tracks operation, the minimum occupancy and the station's location that is too close to the  station causes this station to be closed.

Services
There are no services at this station after the double tracks was operation.

Incidents
On 25 December 2001 at 04.32, the Empu Jaya train crashed into the Gaya Baru Malam Selatan train which was stopping. Dozens of passengers died and dozens were injured.

References

External links

Brebes Regency
Railway stations in Central Java
Railway stations opened in 1916
Railway stations closed in 2014
Defunct railway stations in Indonesia